George Naicker (1 June 1919 – 8 April 1998) was a prominent South African anti-apartheid activist of Indian Tamil descent. He was one of six sons. His mother died while in prison on Robben Island.

Early days with Indian National Congress
Billy Nair, whose association with Naicker dated from 1950 when he was a branch member of the Seaview, Bellair, Hilary and Umhlatuzana area of the Natal Indian Congress, says that Naicker was a delegate to the Congress of the People and joined the South African Communist Party in 1955/56, i.e. in its illegal period. The party had been banned at the time by the South African government.

Incarceration on Robben Island
Prior to his arrest in July, 1963 he was employed as a legal clerk at the late G.S. Naidoo's office in Queen Street. While the constitution of the ANC made membership exclusive to Africans, Naicker from his daily work in a legal office knew the mind-boggling quality of the oppression and deprivation visited on African life. Ndabazabantu courts is where you would find Naicker regularly. Long after he went to Robben Island his clients were searching for him not believing that he was in prison.

Sunny Singh (ex-Robben Islander) states that he met Naicker of NIC Youth Congress and was a Youth Delegate to the World Youth Festival (in Hungary).

In 1964, charged with sabotage and other charges, he was sentenced to long terms of imprisonment. He served his 14-year sentence to the day and returned home to further restrictions and house arrest orders on the 28 February 1978. The imposition of punishment by the courts did not satisfy police officers. They imposed further restrictions on his release, while Archie Gumede employed him on his release.

Today many peacetime activists have surfaced, but Naicker through the organisations he worked in challenged the might of the Nationalist party, incurred their wrath and took whatever punishment was meted out. He never capitulated on the Freedom Charter.

MK structures outside the country found that a police agent had infiltrated ANC ranks. It as decided to remove Ebi and Naicker from the country in 1980. The only description of Naicker MK had was his very small feet.

ANC return of home
When African National Congress started to return home in 1990. Naicker was charged with taking care of the assets of the ANC in Lusaka and elsewhere, in a traumatic period, where some tried to personalize the organisation's possessions. He stayed behind.

George Naicker was a minuscule fellow weighing at most 50 kg and wearing size 4 shoes. He was unassuming, always in the background, never in leadership roles.

On Robben Island, he and Sunny Singh attended to getting the news together.  He took part in the celebrations to honour the USSR on the 7 November every year under the noses of the warders. He suffered the extreme pain and indignity of a straitjacket.

Naicker died in 1998 in Zimbabwe.

References
STATEMENT ON THE DEATH OF VETERAN GEORGE NAICKER

1919 births
1998 deaths
South African people of Tamil descent
African National Congress politicians
South African Communist Party politicians
Inmates of Robben Island
Natal Indian Congress politicians
South African politicians of Indian descent